Clemens W. Ruh (October 31, 1915 – October 5, 1973) was an American professional basketball player. He played in the National Basketball League for the Hammond Ciesar All-Americans during the 1940–41 season and averaged 3.7 points per game.

References 

1915 births
1973 deaths
American men's basketball players
Basketball players from Indiana
Guards (basketball)
Hammond Ciesar All-Americans players
USC Trojans men's basketball players